is a Japanese science fiction writer. She won the 6th Hayakawa SF Contest in 1980, when she was still a student. Later she published various SF works and became the 10th president of the Science Fiction and Fantasy Writers of Japan. Ōhara is the Winner of the Nihon SF Taisho Award in 1994.

Biography 
Ōhara was born in Osaka. She wrote Kirk/Spock fan fiction in her teens. She graduated from the Department of Literature, course of psychology, in the Seishin University.

Ōhara won the 6th Hayakawa SF Contest for her short story "Hitori de Aruite itta Neko (A Cat who Walked along Alone)" in 1980. Next year, in 1981, she graduated from the University and started publishing her stories in the S-F Magazine. She belongs to the 3rd generation of the Japanese SF writers.

In 1991, her "Haiburiddo Chairudo, Hybrid Child" ( won the Seiun Award for Japanese novel. Then, in 1995 she won the 15th Nihon SF Taisho Award for "Sensō-wo Enjita Kamigamitachi, Gods who Bandied War".

She was a science fiction reviewer for Asahi Shimbun from April 1998 to March 2002, and she was on the jury for the Nihon SF Taisho Awards from 1997 to 1999. She was also the 10th president of the Science Fiction and Fantasy Writers of Japan from September 1999 to September 2001.

Ōhara is a member of the Science Fiction and Fantasy Writers of Japan, of the Japanese Writers' Association (JA), and, of the Nihon Pen Club (JA).

Awards 
 1980: 6th Hayakawa SF Contest Award for Hitori de Aruite itta Neko
 1991: 22nd Seiun Award (Japanese long novel) for Hybrid Child
 1994: 15th Nihon SF Taisho Award for Sensō wo Enjita Kamigami-tachi
 1998: 19th Seiun Award (Japanese short novel) for Independence Day in Ōsaka

Selected works

Novels 
 Hitori de Aruite itta Neko, 1982, Hayakawa Publishing
 Kikaishin Asura, 1983, Hayakawa Publishing
 Ginga Network de Uta wo Utatta Kujira, 1984年, Hayakwa Publishing
 Miika wa Miika, Trouble Maker, 1985, Shueisha
 Miraishi-tachi, 1986, Hayakawa Publishing
 Ishi no Koku City, 1986, Tokuma Shoten

 Mental Female, 1988, Hayakawa Publishing 

 Hybrid Child (Haiburiddo Chairudo), 1990, Hayakawa Publishing

 Kyōfu no Katachi, 1993, Asahi Sonorama
 Sensō wo Enjita Kamigami-tachi, 1994, Aspect
 Sensō wo Enjita Kamigami-tachi II ( II), 1997, Askie Aspect
 Archaic States, 1997, Hayakawa Publishing 
 Mitsumeru Onna, 1999, Kousaidou

Works in English translation 
"The Mental Female" (The Review of Contemporary Fiction, Summer 2002)
"Girl" (Speculative Japan, Kurodahan Press, 2007)
"The Whale that Sang on the Milky Way Network" (Speculative Japan 2, Kurodahan Press, 2011)
 Hybrid Child (trans. Jodie Beck, University of Minnesota Press, 2018)

Video game works 
Mariko Ōhara did the scenario for Quintet's video game Illusion of Gaia, along with Masaya Hashimoto and Tomoyoshi Miyazaki.

Notes and references 

The Encyclopedia of Science Fiction page 641

External links
Official Site
SFWJ Profile

1959 births
Living people
Japanese science fiction writers
People from Osaka Prefecture
Women science fiction and fantasy writers
Japanese women writers
University of the Sacred Heart (Japan) alumni